The Schröder–Bernstein theorem from set theory has analogs in the context operator algebras. This article discusses such operator-algebraic results.

For von Neumann algebras 
Suppose M is a von Neumann algebra and E, F are projections in M. Let ~ denote the Murray-von Neumann equivalence relation on M. Define a partial order « on the family of projections by E « F if E ~ F'  ≤ F. In other words, E « F if there exists a partial isometry U ∈ M such that U*U = E and UU* ≤ F.

For closed subspaces M and N where projections PM and PN, onto M and N respectively, are elements of M, M « N if PM « PN.

The Schröder–Bernstein theorem states that if M « N and N « M, then M ~ N.

A proof, one that is similar to a set-theoretic argument, can be sketched as follows. Colloquially, N « M means that N can be isometrically embedded in M. So

where N0 is an isometric copy of N in M. By assumption, it is also true that, N, therefore N0, contains an isometric copy M1 of M. Therefore, one can write

By induction,

It is clear that

Let

So

and

Notice

The theorem now follows from the countable additivity of  ~.

Representations of C*-algebras 
There is also an analog of Schröder–Bernstein for representations of C*-algebras. If A is a C*-algebra, a representation of A  is a *-homomorphism φ from A into L(H), the bounded operators on some Hilbert space H.

If there exists a projection P in L(H) where P φ(a) = φ(a) P for every a in A, then a subrepresentation σ of φ can be defined in a natural way: σ(a) is φ(a) restricted to the range of P. So φ then can be expressed as a direct sum of two subrepresentations φ = φ'  ⊕ σ.

Two representations φ1 and φ2, on H1 and H2 respectively, are said to be unitarily equivalent if there exists a unitary operator U: H2 → H1 such that φ1(a)U = Uφ2(a), for every a.

In this setting, the Schröder–Bernstein theorem reads:

If two representations ρ and σ, on Hilbert spaces H and G respectively, are each unitarily equivalent to a subrepresentation of the other, then they are unitarily equivalent.

A proof that resembles the previous argument can be outlined. The assumption implies that there exist surjective partial isometries from H to G and from G to H. Fix two such partial isometries for the argument. One has

In turn,

By induction,

and

Now each additional summand in the direct sum expression is obtained using one of the two fixed partial isometries, so

This proves the theorem.

See also
 Schröder–Bernstein theorem for measurable spaces
 Schröder–Bernstein property

References

 B. Blackadar, Operator Algebras, Springer, 2006.

C*-algebras
Functional analysis
Operator theory
Von Neumann algebras